The Sauto Theater opened in 1863 in Matanzas, Cuba, and has since then been a proud symbol of the city. The U-shaped 775-seat theatre is almost entirely covered with wood-panelling. It has three balconies, and its floor can be raised to convert the auditorium into a ballroom. The original theater curtain is a painting of the Puente de la Concordia over the Yumurí River. The lobby is graced by Carrara marble statues of Greek goddesses and the main hall ceiling bears paintings of the muses.

History 

When it opened in 1863, it was named Teatro Esteban, after the Civil Governor of Matanzas at the time, Pedro Esteban y Arranz. But soon it adopted the last name of Ambrosio de la Concepción Sauto, a patron of the arts who contributed much to its construction and splendour. Due to the proximity of Matanzas to Havana, the cultural awareness of its people, and the solvency of its rich landowners, the Sauto Theater was visited regularly by the great performers who appeared in Havana.

The Sauto attracted world famous performers such as French actress Sarah Bernhardt (in Camille in 1887), Russian dancer Anna Pavlova in 1945, Cuban composer José White Lafitte, Italian opera singer Enrico Caruso, and Spanish guitarist Andrés Segovia.

The theatre today
Besides being a sub-venue for important international events held in the capital, such as the International Ballet Festival and Mayo Teatral, the Sauto presents programmes about five days a week. Considered the most elegant and functional of 19th-century Cuban theatres, it has become a symbol of the city, so much so that the great Mexican muralist Diego Rivera once said, "I recognize Matanzas by the Sauto." The theatre was declared a National Monument in 1978.

The theatre was closed for renovations between 2010 and 2018.It forms, together with the Junco Palace of the Provincial Museum and the La Vigía building of the Provincial Council of Fine Arts, the Pedro Esquerré Gallery Museum, the Historical Ensemble of the Plaza de las Armas.

See also
Circuba

References

External links 
  Sauto Theatre on planetware.com in English

Commercial buildings completed in 1863
Theatres in Cuba
Spanish Colonial architecture in Cuba
Neoclassical architecture in Cuba
Buildings and structures in Matanzas
Tourist attractions in Matanzas Province
Theatres completed in 1863
Music venues completed in 1863
19th-century architecture in Cuba